Zanzibar is an insular semi-autonomous province which united with Tanganyika in 1964 to form the United Republic of Tanzania. The capital is Zanzibar City, located on the island of Unguja. Its historic centre, Stone Town, is a World Heritage Site.

Zanzibar's main industries are spices, raffia and tourism. In particular, the islands produce cloves, nutmeg, cinnamon, and black pepper. For this reason, the Zanzibar Archipelago, together with Tanzania's Mafia Island, are sometimes referred to locally as the "Spice Islands". Tourism in Zanzibar is a more recent activity, driven by government promotion that caused an increase from 19,000 tourists in 1985, to 376,000 in 2016. The islands are accessible via 5 ports and the Abeid Amani Karume International Airport, which can serve up to 1.5 million passengers per year.

Zanzibar's marine ecosystem is an important part of the economy for fishing and algaculture and contains important marine ecosystems that act as fish nurseries for Indian Ocean fish populations. Moreover, the land ecosystem is the home of the endemic Zanzibar red colobus, the Zanzibar servaline genet, and the extinct or rare Zanzibar leopard. Pressure from the tourist industry and fishing as well as larger threats such as sea level rise caused by climate change are creating increasing environmental concerns throughout the region.

Etymology 
The word Zanzibar came from Arabic zanjibār, which is in turn from Persian zangbâr, a compound of Zang ("black") + bâr ("coast"), cf. the Sea of Zanj. The name is one of several toponyms sharing similar etymologies, ultimately meaning "land of the blacks" or similar meanings, in reference to the dark skin of the inhabitants.

History

Pre-1498 
The presence of microliths suggests that Zanzibar has been home to humans for at least 20,000 years, which was the beginning of the Later Stone Age.

A Greco-Roman text between the 1st and 3rd centuries, the Periplus of the Erythraean Sea, mentioned the island of Menuthias, which is probably Unguja. Zanzibar, like the nearby coast, was settled by Bantu speakers at the outset of the first millennium. Archaeological finds at Fukuchani, on the northwest coast of Zanzibar, indicate a settled agricultural and fishing community from the 6th century at the latest. The considerable amount of daub found indicates timber buildings, and shell beads, bead grinders, and iron slag have been found at the site. There is evidence of limited engagement in long-distance trade: a small amount of imported pottery has been found, less than 1% of total pottery finds, mostly from the Gulf and dated to the 5th to 8th century. The similarity to contemporary sites such as Mkokotoni and Dar es Salaam indicates a unified group of communities that developed into the first center of coastal maritime culture. The coastal towns appear to have been engaged in Indian Ocean and inland African trade at this early period. Trade rapidly increased in importance and quantity beginning in the mid-8th century and by the close of the 10th century Zanzibar was one of the central Swahili trading towns.

Excavations at nearby Pemba Island, but especially at Shanga in the Lamu Archipelago, provide the clearest picture of architectural development. Houses were originally built with timber (circa 1050) and later in mud with coral walls (circa 1150). The houses were continually rebuilt with more permanent materials. By the 13th century, houses were built with stone, and bonded with mud, and the 14th century saw the use of lime to bond stone. Only the wealthier patricians would have had stone and lime built houses, the strength of the materials allowing for flat roofs, while the majority of the population lived in single-story thatched houses similar to those from the 11th and 12th centuries. According to John Middleton and Mark Horton, the architectural style of these stone houses have no Arab or Persian elements, and should be viewed as an entirely indigenous development of local vernacular architecture. While much of Zanzibar Town's architecture was rebuilt during Omani rule, nearby sites elucidate the general development of Swahili, and Zanzibari, architecture before the 15th century.

From the 9th century, Swahili merchants on Zanzibar operated as brokers for long-distance traders from both the hinterland and Indian Ocean world. Persian, Indian, and Arab traders frequented Zanzibar to acquire East African goods like gold, ivory, and ambergris and then shipped them overseas to Asia. Similarly, caravan traders from the African Great Lakes and Zambezian Region came to the coast to trade for imported goods, especially Indian cloth. Before the Portuguese arrival, the southern towns of Unguja Ukuu and Kizimkazi and the northern town of Tumbatu were the dominant centers of exchange. Zanzibar was just one of the many autonomous city-states that dotted the East African littoral. These towns grew in wealth as the Swahili people served as intermediaries and facilitators to merchants and traders. This interaction between Central African and Indian Ocean cultures contributed in part to the evolution of the Swahili culture, which developed an Arabic-script literary tradition. Although a Bantu language, the Swahili language as a consequence today includes some borrowed elements, particularly loanwords from Arabic, though this was mostly a 19th-century phenomenon with the growth of Omani hegemony. Many foreign traders from Africa and Asia married into wealthy patrician families on Zanzibar. Particularly Asian men, who "wintered" on the coast for up to six months because of the prevailing monsoon wind patterns, married East African women. Since most Asian traders were Muslim, their children inherited their paternal ethnic identity, though East African matrilineal traditions remained key.

Portuguese colonization 

Vasco da Gama's visit in 1498 marked the beginning of European influence. In 1503 or 1504, Zanzibar became part of the Portuguese Empire when Captain Ruy Lourenço Ravasco Marques landed and demanded and received tribute from the sultan, in exchange for peace. Zanzibar remained a possession of Portugal for almost two centuries. It initially became part of the Portuguese province of Arabia and Ethiopia and was administered by a governor general. Around 1571, Zanzibar became part of the western division of the Portuguese empire and was administered from Mozambique. It appears, however, that the Portuguese did not closely administer Zanzibar. The first English ship to visit Unguja, the Edward Bonaventure in 1591, found that there was no Portuguese fort or garrison. The extent of their occupation was a trade depot where produce was purchased and collected for shipment to Mozambique. "In other respects, the affairs of the island were managed by the local 'king', the predecessor of the Mwinyi Mkuu of Dunga." This hands-off approach ended when Portugal established a fort on Pemba Island around 1635 in response to the Sultan of Mombasa's slaughter of Portuguese residents several years earlier. Portugal had long considered Pemba to be a troublesome launching point for rebellions in Mombasa against Portuguese rule.

The precise origins of the sultans of Unguja are uncertain. However, their capital at Unguja Ukuu is believed to have been an extensive town. Possibly constructed by locals, it was composed mainly of perishable materials.

Sultanate of Zanzibar 

The Portuguese arrived in East Africa in 1498, where they found several independent towns on the coast, with Muslim Arabic-speaking elites. While the Portuguese travelers describe them as 'black' they made a clear distinction between the Muslim and non-Muslim populations. Their relations with these leaders were mostly hostile, but during the sixteenth century they firmly established their power, and ruled with the aid of tributary sultans. The Portuguese presence was relatively limited, leaving administration in the hands of preexisting local leaders and power structures. This system lasted until 1631, when the Sultan of Mombasa massacred the Portuguese inhabitants. For the remainder of their rule, the Portuguese appointed European governors. The strangling of trade and diminished local power led the Swahili elites in Mombasa and Zanzibar to invite Omani aristocrats to assist them in driving the Europeans out.

In 1698, Zanzibar came under the influence of the Sultanate of Oman. There was a brief revolt against Omani rule in 1784. Local elites invited Omani merchant princes to settle on Zanzibar in the first half of the nineteenth century, preferring them to the Portuguese. Many locals today continue to emphasize that indigenous Zanzibaris had invited Seyyid Said, the first Busaidi sultan, to their island, claiming a patron-client relationship with powerful families was a strategy used by many Swahili coast towns since at least the fifteenth century.

In 1832, or 1840 (the date varies among sources), Said bin Sultan, Sultan of Muscat and Oman moved his capital from Muscat, Oman to Stone Town. After Said's death in June 1856, two of his sons, Thuwaini bin Said and Majid bin Said, struggled over the succession. Said's will divided his dominions into two separate principalities, with Thuwaini to become the Sultan of Oman and Majid to become the first Sultan of Zanzibar; the brothers quarreled about the will, which was eventually upheld by Charles Canning, 1st Earl Canning, Great Britain's Viceroy and Governor-General of India.

Until around 1890, the sultans of Zanzibar controlled a substantial portion of the Swahili coast known as Zanj, which included Mombasa and Dar es Salaam. Beginning in 1886, Great Britain and Germany plotted to obtain parts of the Zanzibar sultanate for their own empires.
In October 1886, a British-German border commission established the Zanj as a  strip along most of the African Great Lakes region's coast, an area stretching from Cape Delgado (now in Mozambique) to Kipini (now in Kenya), including Mombasa and Dar es Salaam. Over the next few years, however, almost all of these mainland possessions were lost to European imperial powers.

The sultans developed an economy of trade and cash crops in the Zanzibar Archipelago with a ruling Arab elite. Ivory was a major trade good. The archipelago, sometimes referred to by locals as the Spice Islands, was famous worldwide for its cloves and other spices, and plantations were developed to grow them. The archipelago's commerce gradually fell into the hands of traders from the Indian subcontinent, whom Said bin Sultan encouraged to settle on the islands.

During his 14-year reign as sultan, Majid bin Said consolidated his power around the east African slave trade. Malindi in Zanzibar City was the Swahili Coast's main port for the slave trade with the Middle East. In the mid-19th century, as many as 50,000 slaves passed annually through the port.

One of Majid's brothers, Barghash bin Said, succeeded him and was forced to abolish the slave trade in the Zanzibar Archipelago by the British. He largely developed Unguja's infrastructure. Another brother of Majid, Khalifa bin Said, was the third sultan of Zanzibar and furthered the relationship with the British which led to the archipelago's progress toward abolishing slavery.

British protectorate 

Control of Zanzibar eventually came into the hands of the British Empire; part of the political impetus for this was the 19th century movement for the abolition of the slave trade. Zanzibar was the center of the east African slave trade. In 1822, Captain Moresby, the British consul in Muscat pressed Sultan Said to end the slave trade by signing Moresby treaty.

The Moresby Treaty was the first of a series of anti-slavery treaties with Britain. It prohibited slave transport south and east of the Moresby Line, from Cape Delgado in Africa to Diu Head on the coast of India. Said lost the revenue he would have received as duty on all slaves sold, so to make up for this shortfall he encouraged the development of the slave trade in Zanzibar itself. Said came under increasing pressure from the British to abolish slavery entirely. In 1842, Britain told Said it wished to abolish the slave trade to Arabia, Oman, Persia, and the Red Sea.

Ships from the Royal Navy were employed to enforce the anti-slavery treaties by capturing any dhows carrying slaves, but with only four ships patrolling a huge area of sea, the British navy found it hard to enforce the treaties as ships from France, Spain, Portugal, and America continued to carry slaves. In 1856, Sultan Majid consolidated his power around the African Great Lakes slave trade. But in 1873, Sir John Kirk informed his successor, Sultan Barghash, that a total blockade of Zanzibar was imminent, and Barghash reluctantly signed the Anglo-Zanzibari treaty which abolished the slave trade in the sultan's territories, closed all slave markets and protected liberated slaves.

The relationship between Britain and the German Empire, at that time the nearest relevant colonial power, was formalized by the 1890 Heligoland–Zanzibar Treaty, in which Germany agreed to "recognize the British protectorate over ... the islands of Zanzibar and Pemba".

In 1890 Zanzibar became a protectorate (not a colony) of Britain. This status meant it remained under the sovereignty of the Sultan of Zanzibar. Prime Minister Salisbury explained the British position:
The condition of a protected dependency is more acceptable to the half civilised races, and more suitable for them than direct dominion. It is cheaper, simpler, less wounding to their self-esteem, gives them more career as public officials, and spares them unnecessary contact with white men.

From 1890 to 1913, traditional viziers were in charge; they were supervised by advisors appointed by the Colonial Office. However, in 1913 a switch was made to a system of direct rule through residents (effectively governors) from 1913. The death of the pro-British Sultan Hamad bin Thuwaini on 25 August 1896 and the succession of Sultan Khalid bin Barghash, whom the British did not approve of, led to the Anglo-Zanzibar War. On the morning of 27 August 1896, ships of the Royal Navy destroyed the Beit al Hukum Palace. A cease-fire was declared 38 minutes later, and to this day the bombardment stands as the shortest war in history.

Zanzibar became the birthplace of famed British singer-songwriter of Queen, Freddie Mercury.

Zanzibar revolution and merger with Tanganyika 

On 10 December 1963, the Protectorate that had existed over Zanzibar since 1890 was terminated by the United Kingdom. The United Kingdom did not grant Zanzibar independence as such, because the UK had never had sovereignty over Zanzibar. Rather, by the Zanzibar Act 1963 of the United Kingdom, the UK ended the Protectorate and made provision for full self-government in Zanzibar as an independent country within the Commonwealth. Upon the Protectorate being abolished, Zanzibar became a constitutional monarchy within the Commonwealth under the Sultan.

However, just a month later, on 12 January 1964 Sultan Jamshid bin Abdullah was deposed during the Zanzibar Revolution. The Sultan fled into exile, and the Sultanate was replaced by the People's Republic of Zanzibar, a socialist government led by the Afro-Shirazi Party (ASP). Over 20,000 people were killed – mostly Arabs and Indians – and many of them escaped the country as a consequence of the revolution.

In April 1964, the republic merged with mainland Tanganyika. This United Republic of Tanganyika and Zanzibar was soon renamed, blending the two names, as the United Republic of Tanzania, within which Zanzibar remains an autonomous region.

Demographics 

The 2002 census is the most recent census for which results have been reported. The total population of Zanzibar was 984,625 – with an annual growth rate of 3.1 percent. The population of Zanzibar City, which was the largest city, was 205,870.

Around two-thirds of the people, 622,459, lived on Unguja (Zanzibar Island), with most settled in the densely populated west. Besides Zanzibar City, other towns on Unguja include Chaani, Mbweni, Mangapwani, Chwaka, and Nungwi. Outside of these towns, most people live in small villages and are engaged in farming or fishing.

The population of Pemba Island was 362,166. The largest town on the island was Chake-Chake, with a population of 19,283. The smaller towns are Wete and Mkoani.

Mafia Island, the other major island of the Zanzibar Archipelago but administered by mainland Tanzania (Tanganyika), had a total population of 40,801.

Ethnic origins 
The people of Zanzibar are of diverse ethnic origins. The first permanent residents of Zanzibar seem to have been the ancestors of the Bantu Hadimu and Tumbatu, who began arriving from the African Great Lakes mainland around AD 1000. They belonged to various mainland ethnic groups and on Zanzibar, generally lived in small villages. They did not coalesce to form larger political units.

During Zanzibar's brief period of independence in the early 1960s, the major political cleavage was between the Shirazi (Zanzibar Africans), who made up approximately 56% of the population, and the Zanzibar Arabs—the bulk of whom arrived from Oman in the 1800s—made up approximately 17%. Today, Zanzibar is inhabited mostly by ethnic Swahili. There are also a number of Arabs, as well as some ethnic Persian, Somalis, and Indian people.

Languages

Swahili 
Zanzibaris speak Swahili (Kiswahili), a Bantu language that is extensively spoken in the African Great Lakes region. Swahili is the de facto national and official language of Tanzania. Many local residents also speak Arabic, English, Italian and French. 
The dialect of Swahili spoken in Zanzibar is called kiunguja. Kiunguja, which has a high percentage of Arabic loanwords, enjoys the status of Standard Swahili not in Tanzania only but also in other countries, where Swahili is spoken.

Arabic 
Three distinct varieties of Arabic are in use in Zanzibar: Standard Arabic, Omani Arabic and Hadrami Arabic. Both vernacular varieties are falling out of use, although the Omani one is spoken by a larger group of people (probably, several hundreds). In parallel to this, Standard Arabic, traditionally associated with the Quran and Islam, is very popular not only among ethnic Arabs but also among Muslims of various descent who inhabit Zanzibar. Nevertheless, Standard Arabic is mastered by very few people. This can be attributed to the aggressive policy of Swahilisation. Despite the prestige and importance the Arabic language once enjoyed, today it is no longer the dominant spoken language.

Religion 

Zanzibar's population is almost entirely Muslim, with a small Christian minority of around 22 000. Other religious groups include Hindus, Jains and Sikhs.

The Anglican Diocese of Zanzibar was founded in 1892. The first Bishop of Zanzibar was Charles Smythies, who was translated from his former post as Bishop of Nyasaland.

Christ Church Cathedral had fallen into poor condition by the late 20th century, but it was fully restored in 2016, at a cost of one million Euros, with a world heritage visitor centre. The restoration was supported by the Tanzanian and Zanzibari governments, and overseen by the diocese in partnership with the World Monuments Fund. The restoration of the spire, clock, and historic Willis organ are still outstanding. Historically the diocese included mainland locations in Tanganyika. In 1963 it was renamed as the Diocese of Zanzibar & Dar es Salaam. Two years later, in 1965, Dar es Salaam became a separate diocese. The original jurisdiction was renamed as the Diocese of Zanzibar & Tanga. In 2001 the mainland links were finally ended, and it is now known as the Diocese of Zanzibar. The diocese includes parishioners on the neighbouring island of Pemba. Ten bishops have served in the diocese from 1892 to the present day. The bishop is Michael Hafidh. It is part of the Province of Tanzania, under the Archbishop of All Tanzania, based at Dodoma.

The Roman Catholic Diocese of Zanzibar, headquartered at the St. Joseph's Cathedral in Stone Town, was established in 1980. An apostolic vicariate of Zanzibar had been established in 1906, from a much larger East African jurisdiction. This was suppressed in 1953, when the territory was put under control of the Kenyan church, but it was restored in 1964 after independence. The church created a diocese here shortly before Easter 1980. The bishop is Augustine Ndeliakyama Shao. Zanzibar is part of the Roman Catholic Province of Dar es Salaam, under the Archbishop of Dar es Salaam.

Other Christian denominations include the Evangelical Lutheran Church of Tanzania which arrived in Zanzibar town in the 1960s, and a wide range of Pentecostal-Charismatic Christian churches such as the Tanzania Assemblies of God, the Free Pentecostal Church of Tanzania, the Evangelical Assemblies of God, the Pentecostal Church of Tanzania, the Victory Church and the Pentecostal Evangelistic Fellowship of Africa. Pentecostal-Charismatic churches have been present and growing in Zanzibar since the 1980s in relation to economic liberalization and increased labor migration from mainland Tanzania in connection to Zanzibar's expanding tourist sector. There are also Seventh Day Adventist and Baptist churches.

Since 2005 there is also an inter-religious body called the Joint Committee of Religious Leaders for Peace (in Swahili Juhudi za Viongozi wa Dini kuimarisha Amani) with representatives from Muslim institutions such as the Islamic law (Kadhi courts), religious property (the Wakf and Trust commission), education (the Muslim academy) and the Mufti'''s office as well as representatives from the Roman Catholic, the Anglican and the Lutheran church.

Places of worship 
The places of worship in the city are predominantly Muslim mosques. There are also Christian churches and temples: Roman Catholic Diocese of Zanzibar (Catholic Church), Anglican Church of Tanzania (Anglican Communion), Evangelical Lutheran Church in Tanzania (Lutheran World Federation), Baptist Convention of Tanzania (Baptist World Alliance), Assemblies of God.

 Government 

As an autonomous part of Tanzania, Zanzibar has its own government, known as the Revolutionary Government of Zanzibar. It is made up of the Revolutionary Council and House of Representatives.
The House of Representatives has a similar composition to the National Assembly of Tanzania. Fifty members are elected directly from constituencies to serve five-year terms; 10 members are appointed by the President of Zanzibar; 15 special seats are for women members of political parties that have representation in the House of Representatives; six members serve ex officio, including all regional commissioners and the attorney general. Five of these 81 members are then elected to represent Zanzibar in the National Assembly.

Unguja has three administrative regions: Zanzibar Central/South, Zanzibar North and Zanzibar Urban/West. Pemba has two: Pemba North and Pemba South.

Concerning the independence and sovereignty of Zanzibar, Tanzania Prime Minister Mizengo Pinda said on 3 July 2008 that there was "nothing like the sovereignty of Zanzibar in the Union Government unless the Constitution is changed in future". Zanzibar House of Representatives members from both the ruling party, Chama Cha Mapinduzi, and the opposition party, Civic United Front, disagreed and stood firmly in recognizing Zanzibar as a fully autonomous state.

 Politics 

Zanzibar has a government of national unity, with the president of Zanzibar being Hussein Ali Mwinyi, since 1 November 2020. There are many political parties in Zanzibar, but the most popular parties are the Chama Cha Mapinduzi (CCM) and the Civic United Front (CUF). Since the early 1990s, the politics of the archipelago have been marked by repeated clashes between these two parties.

Contested elections in October 2000 led to a massacre on 27 January 2001 when, according to Human Rights Watch, the army and police shot into crowds of protestors, killing at least 35 and wounding more than 600. Those forces, accompanied by ruling party officials and militias, also went on a house-to-house rampage, indiscriminately arresting, beating, and sexually abusing residents. Approximately 2,000 temporarily fled to Kenya.

Violence erupted again after another contested election on 31 October 2005, with the CUF claiming that its rightful victory had been stolen from it. Nine people were killed.

Following 2005, negotiations between the two parties aiming at the long-term resolution of the tensions and a power-sharing accord took place, but they suffered repeated setbacks. The most notable of these took place in April 2008, when the CUF walked away from the negotiating table following a CCM call for a referendum to approve of what had been presented as a done deal on the power-sharing agreement.

In November 2009, the then-president of Zanzibar, Amani Abeid Karume, met with CUF secretary-general Seif Sharif Hamad at the State House to discuss how to save Zanzibar from future political turmoil and to end the animosity between them. This move was welcomed by many, including the United States. It was the first time since the multi-party system was introduced in Zanzibar that the CUF agreed to recognize Karume as the legitimate president of Zanzibar.

A proposal to amend Zanzibar's constitution to allow rival parties to form governments of national unity was adopted by 66.2 percent of voters on 31 July 2010.

The autonomous status of Zanzibar is viewed as comparable to Hong Kong as suggested by some scholars, and with some recognizing the island as an "African Hong Kong".

Nowadays, The Alliance for Change and Transparency-Wazalendois (ACT-Wazalendo) is considered the main opposition political party of semi-autonomous Zanzibar. The constitution of Zanzibar requires the party that comes in second in the polls to join a coalition with the winning party. ACT-Wazalendo joined a coalition government with the islands' ruling party Chama Cha Mapinduzi in December 2020 after Zanzibar disputed elections.

 Geography 

Zanzibar is one of the Indian Ocean islands. It is situated on the Swahili Coast, adjacent to Tanganyika (mainland Tanzania).

The northern tip of Unguja island is located at 5.72 degrees south, 39.30 degrees east, with the southernmost point at 6.48 degrees south, 39.51 degrees east. Unguja is mainly low lying, with its highest point being . Unguja is characterised by beautiful sandy beaches with fringing coral reefs. The reefs are rich in marine biodiversity.

The northern tip of Pemba island is located at 4.87 degrees south, 39.68 degrees east, and the southernmost point is located at 5.47 degrees south, 39.72 degrees east. Pemba is also mainly low lying, with its highest point being .

 Climate 

Zanzibar has a tropical monsoon climate (Am). The heat of summer (corresponding to the Northern Hemisphere winter) is often cooled by strong sea breezes associated with the northeast monsoon (known as Kaskazi in Kiswahili), particularly on the north and east coasts. Being near to the equator, the islands are warm year round. The rainfall regime is split into two main seasons, a primary maximum in March, April, and May in association with the southwest monsoon (known locally as Kusi in Kiswahili), and a secondary maximum in November and December. The months in between receive less rain, with a minimum in July.

 Wildlife 

 Unguja 

The main island of Zanzibar, Unguja, has a fauna reflecting its connection to the African mainland during the last Ice Age.

Endemic mammals with continental relatives include the Zanzibar red colobus (Procolobus kirkii), one of Africa's rarest primates, with perhaps only 1,500 existing. Isolated on this island for at least 1,000 years, this colobus is recognized as a distinct species, with different coat patterns, calls, and food habits from related colobus species on the mainland. The Zanzibar red colobus lives in a wide variety of drier areas of coastal thickets and coral rag scrub, as well as mangrove swamps and agricultural areas. About one third of them live in and around Jozani Forest. The easiest place to see the colobus is farmland adjacent to the reserve. They are accustomed to people and the low vegetation means they come close to the ground.

Rare native animals include the Zanzibar leopard, which is critically endangered, and the recently described Zanzibar servaline genet. There are no large wild animals in Unguja. Forested areas such as Jozani are inhabited by monkeys, bushpigs, small antelopes, African palm civets, and, as shown by a camera trap in June 2018, the elusive leopard. Various species of mongoose can also be found on the island. There is a wide variety of birdlife and a large number of butterflies in rural areas.

 Pemba 
Pemba Island is separated from Unguja island and the African continent by deep channels and has a correspondingly restricted fauna, reflecting its comparative isolation from the mainland. The island is home to the Pemba flying fox.

 Standard of living and health 
Considerable disparities exist in the standard of living for inhabitants of Pemba and Unguja, as well as the disparity between urban and rural populations. The average annual income is US $2500. About half the population lives below the poverty line.

Despite a relatively high standard of primary health care and education, infant mortality in Zanzibar is 54 out of 1,000 live births, which is 10.0 percent lower than the rate in mainland Tanzania. The child mortality rate in Zanzibar is 73 out of 1,000 live births, which is 21.5 percent lower than the rate in mainland Tanzania. The birth rate in Tanzania in 2021 is high, 35.64 births per 1000 population, but the rate is falling.

It is estimated that 7% of children on Zanzibar have acute malnutrition.

Life expectancy at birth is 57 years, which is significantly lower than the 2010 world average of 67.2.

The general prevalence of HIV/AIDS in the population of Zanzibar aged 15–64 is 0.5 percent, with the rate much higher in females (0.9 percent) than males (less than 0.1 percent).

 Environment 
The northern part of the island presents elevated volumes of trash in the streets, beaches and the ocean—mostly plastic bottles, other plastics and cigarette butts. There is indiscriminate dumping in residential areas. Medical equipment waste is a particular problem on the island.

 Climate change impact 

Studies conducted show temperatures and wind speeds have increased strongly over the last 40 years. These climatic stressors, in addition to the changes in rainfall patterns have had significant effects on the seaweed farming, causing seaweed to rot or be destroyed in the process of yielding.

 Economy 

Ancient pottery implies trade routes with Zanzibar as far back as the time of the ancient Assyrians. Traders from the Arabian Peninsula, the Persian Gulf region of modern-day Iran (especially Shiraz), and west India probably visited Zanzibar as early as the 1st century. They used the monsoon winds to sail across the Indian Ocean to land at the sheltered harbor located on the site of present-day Zanzibar City.

The clove, originating from the Moluccan Islands (today in Indonesia), was introduced in Zanzibar by the Omani sultans in the first half of the 19th century. Zanzibar, mainly Pemba Island, was once the world's leading clove producer, but annual clove sales have plummeted by 80 percent since the 1970s. Zanzibar's clove industry has been crippled by a fast-moving global market, international competition, and a hangover from Tanzania's failed experiment with socialism in the 1960s and 1970s, when the government controlled clove prices and exports. Zanzibar now ranks a distant third with Indonesia supplying 75 percent of the world's cloves compared to Zanzibar's 7 percent.

Zanzibar exports spices, seaweed and fine raffia. Beside the Zanzibar State Trading Cooperation, Zanj Spice Limited, also known as 1001 Organic, is the biggest organic spice exporter in Zanzibar. Zanzibar also has a large fishing and dugout canoe production. Tourism is a major foreign currency earner.

The Government of Zanzibar legalized foreign exchange bureaux on the islands before mainland Tanzania moved to do so. The effect was to increase the availability of consumer commodities. The government has also established a free port area, which provides the following benefits: contribution to economic diversification by providing a window for free trade as well as stimulating the establishment of support services; administration of a regime that imports, exports, and warehouses general merchandise; adequate storage facilities and other infrastructure to cater for effective operation of trade; and creation of an efficient management system for effective re-exportation of goods.

The island's manufacturing sector is limited mainly to import substitution industries, such as cigarettes, shoes, and processed agricultural products. In 1992, the government designated two export-producing zones and encouraged the development of offshore financial services. Zanzibar still imports much of its staple requirements, petroleum products, and manufactured articles.

There is also a possibility of oil availability in Zanzibar on the island of Pemba, and efforts have been made by the Tanzanian government and Zanzibar revolutionary government to exploit what could be one of the most significant discoveries in recent memory. Oil would help boost the economy of Zanzibar, but there have been disagreements about dividends between the Tanzanian mainland and Zanzibar, the latter claiming the oil should be excluded in Union matters.

In 2007, a Norwegian consultancy firm went to Zanzibar to determine how the region could develop its oil potential. The firm recommended that Zanzibar follow economist Hernando de Soto Polar's ideas about the formalization of property rights for persons living on ancestral land for which they probably do not have a legal deed.

 Tourism 

 Energy 

The energy sector in Zanzibar consists of unreliable electric power, petroleum and petroleum products; it is also supplemented by firewood and its related products. Coal and gas are rarely used for either domestic or industrial purposes.

Unguja (Zanzibar Island) gets most of its electric power from mainland Tanzania through a 39-kilometer, 100-megawatt submarine cable from Ras Kiromoni (near Dar es Salaam) to Ras Fumba on Unguja. The laying of the cable was begun on 10 October 2012 by the Viscas Corporation of Japan and was funded by a US$28.1 million grant from the United States through the Millennium Challenge Corporation.132kV Sabmarine Cable – Zanzibar Iterconnector at Ras Kiromoni and Ras Fumba , Featured Project, Salem Construction, Ltd. The cable became operational on 13 April 2013. The previous 45-megawatt cable, which was seldom-maintained, was completed by Norway in 1980.

The cable project was financed through a 45 million euro grant from Norway and contributions of 8 million euros from the Zanzibar government and 4 million euros from the Tanzanian national government. The project ended years of dependence on unreliable and erratic diesel generation subject to frequent power cuts. Only about 20 percent of the cable's capacity was being used in January 2011, so it is anticipated that the cable will meet the island's needs for 20 to 25 years."Reliable electricity attracts investors to Pemba" , Norway: The Official Site in Tanzania, 28 January 2011.

Between 70 and 75 percent of the electricity generated is used domestically while less than 20 percent is used industrially. Fuel wood, charcoal and kerosene are widely used as sources of energy for cooking and lighting for most rural and urban areas. The consumption capacity of petroleum, gas, oil, kerosene and industrial diesel oil is increasing annually, going from a total of 5,650 tons consumed in 1997 to more than 7,500 tons in 1999.

From 21 May to 19 June 2008, Unguja suffered a major failure of its electricity system, which left the island without electrical service and mostly dependent on diesel generators. The failure originated in mainland Tanzania. Another blackout happened from 10 December 2009 to 23 March 2010, caused by a problem with the submarine cable that formerly supplied electricity from mainland Tanzania. This led to a serious shock to Unguja's fragile economy, which is heavily dependent on foreign tourism.

 Transport 

 Roads 
Zanzibar has 1,600 kilometres of roads, of which 85 percent are tarmacked or semi-tarmacked. The remainder are earth roads, which are rehabilitated annually to make them passable throughout the year.. Zanzibar, to ensure the roads are passable at all times and are maintained had established a Road Fund Board, situated at maisala which collects funds and disburses to Ministry of Communication, whom is the Road Agency at this time through the Department of Road Maintenance, known as UUB.

The Road Fund Board, oversees a Performance Agreement entered between the Ministry of Communication and Infrastructure, while all the procurements and maintenances are assumed by the later.

 Public transportation 

There is no government-owned public transportation in Zanzibar. The privately owned Daladala, as it is officially known in Zanzibar, is the only kind of public transportation. The term Daladala originated from the Kiswahili word DALA(Dollar) or five shillings during the 1970s and 1980s when public transport cost five shillings to travel to the nearest town. Therefore, travelling to town will cost a Dollar("Dala") and returning will again cost a Dollar, hence the term Daladala originated.

Stone Town is the main hub for Daladalas on Zanzibar and nearly all journeys will either start or end here. There are two main Dala Dala stations in Stone Town: Darajani market and Mwanakwerekwe market. The Darajani market terminus serves the North and North East of the island and the Mwanakwerekwe market terminus serves the South and South East. As with most of East African transport, the buses do not run on set schedules – instead departing when full. As there is no fixed schedule, it is not possible to book tickets in advance (with the exception of The Zanzibus). There are plans of implementing a government-operated bus service on the island, which will bring the ground transportations more in line with the relatively developed water and air transport infrastructure, but there is currently no timeline available for this project. With Zanzibar visitor numbers set to top 1,000,000 annually, there will be increasing pressure on the current transportation network – the bus network will reduce the number of vehicles on the road and help reduce environmental impact of tourism on Zanzibar.

 Maritime transport 
 Ports 

There are five ports in the islands of Unguja and Pemba, all operated and developed by the Zanzibar Ports Corporation.

The main port at Malindi, which handles 90 percent of Zanzibar's trade, was built in 1925. The port was rehabilitated between 1989 and 1992 with financial assistance from the European Union. The Italian contractor, Salini Impregilo S.p.A., was supposed to build wharves that lasted 60 years; however, the wharves lasted only 11 years before crumbling and degenerating because the company deviated from the specifications. After a long legal battle, the company was required in 2005 by the International Court of Arbitration to pay Zanzibar US$11.6 million in damages. The port was again rehabilitated between 2004 and 2009 with a 31 million euro grant from the European Union. The contract was awarded to M/S E. Phil and Sons of Denmark. The then-director of the contractor suggested that the rehabilitation would last a minimum of 50 years. But the port is again facing problems, including sinking.

Ferry accidents
The MV Faith, which began its final journey at the port of Dar es Salaam, sank in May 2009 shortly before docking at the port of Malindi. Six of the 25 people aboard lost their lives.

The sinking of the MV Spice Islander I on 10 September 2011, after departing from Unguja island for Pemba Island, was the worst disaster in Tanzanian history. In a report to the Zanzibar House of Representatives on 14 October 2011, Zanzibar's Second Vice President, Ambassador Seif Ali Iddi, said that 2,764 people were missing, 203 bodies had been recovered, and 619 passengers were rescued. It was the worst maritime disaster in Tanzanian history. A presidential commission, however, reported three months later that 1,370 people were missing, 203 bodies had been recovered, and 941 passengers survived. Severe overloading caused the ferry to sink.

The MV Skagit, which also began its final journey at the port of Dar es Salaam, capsized in rough seas near Chumbe island on 18 July 2012. The ferry had 447 passengers, with 81 dead, 212 missing and presumed drowned, and 154 rescued. The ferry left port despite warnings from the Tanzania Meteorological Agency for ships not to attempt the crossing from Dar es Salaam to Unguja island because of the rough seas. A presidential commission reported in October 2012 that overloading was the cause of the disaster.Yussuf, Issa (12 October 2012). "Tanzania: Overloading Blamed for Ill-Fated Boat" . Daily News (via AllAfrica.com). Retrieved 14 September 2013.

 Airport 
Zanzibar's main airport, Abeid Amani Karume International Airport, has been able to handle large passenger planes since 2011, which has resulted in an increase in passenger and cargo inflows and outflows. Since another increase in capacity by the end of 2013, it can serve up to 1.5 million passengers per year. The island can be reached by flights operated by Air France, Auric Air, Coastal Aviation,. Lufthansa, Ethiopian Airlines, Kenya Airways, FlyDubai, Mango (airline), Qatar Airways, Turkish Airlines and others.

 Culture 

Zanzibar's most famous event is the Zanzibar International Film Festival (ZIFF), also known as the Festival of the Dhow Countries. Every July, this event showcases the best of the Swahili Coast arts scene, including Zanzibar's favorite music, taarab.

Important architectural features in Stone Town are the Livingstone house, The Old dispensary of Zanzibar, the Guliani Bridge, Ngome kongwe (The Old fort of Zanzibar) and the House of Wonders. The town of Kidichi features the Hamamni Persian Baths, built by immigrants from Shiraz, Iran during the reign of Barghash bin Said.

Zanzibar also is the only place in Eastern African countries to have the long settlement houses formally known as Michenzani flats. The flats were built with aid from East Germany during the 1970s to solve housing problems in Zanzibar.

 Media and communication 
In 1973, Zanzibar introduced the first colour television service in sub-Saharan Africa. Because of longstanding opposition to television by President Julius Nyerere, the first television service on mainland Tanzania was not introduced until 1994. The broadcaster in Zanzibar called Television Zanzibar (TVZ) had recently changed name to Zanzibar Broadcasting Corporation (ZBC). following an enactment of an act to make it a public corporation, monitored under the Ministry of Finance by the treasurer registrar. Among the famous reporters of TVZ during the 1980s and 1990s were the late Alwiya Alawi 1961–1996 (the elder sister of Inat Alawi, famous Taarab singer during the 1980s), Neema Mussa, Sharifa Maulid, Fatma Mzee, Zaynab Ali, Ramadhan Ali, and Khamis.

Zanzibar has one AM radio station and 21 FM radio stations.

In terms of landline communications, Zanzibar is served by the Tanzania Telecommunications Company Limited and Zantel Tanzania.

Almost all mobile and Internet companies serving mainland Tanzania are also available in Zanzibar.

 Education 

In 2000 there were 207 government schools and 118 privately owned schools in Zanzibar. Zanzibar has three fully accredited Universities: Zanzibar University, the State University of Zanzibar (SUZA) and Sumait University (previously University College of Education, Chukwani).

SUZA was established in 1999, and is located in Stone Town, in the buildings of the former Institute of Kiswahili and Foreign Language (TAKILUKI). It is the only public institution for higher learning in Zanzibar, the other two institutions being private. In 2004, the three institutions had a total enrollment of 948 students, of whom 207 were female.

The primary and secondary education system in Zanzibar is slightly different from that of the Tanzanian mainland. On the mainland, education is only compulsory for the seven years of primary education, while in Zanzibar an additional three years of secondary education are compulsory and free. Students in Zanzibar score significantly less on standardized tests for reading and mathematics than students on the mainland.

In the 1970s, 1980s and 1990s, national service after secondary education was necessary, but it is now voluntary and few students volunteer. Most choose to seek employment or attend teacher's colleges.

 Sports 

Football is the most popular sport in Zanzibar, overseen by the Zanzibar Football Association. Zanzibar is an associate member of the Confederation of African Football (CAF), but not of FIFA. This means that the Zanzibar national football team is not eligible to enter national CAF competitions, such as the African Nations Cup, but Zanzibar's football clubs get representation at the CAF Confederation Cup and the CAF Champions League.

The national team participates in non-FIFA Football tournaments such as the FIFI Wild Cup, and the ELF Cup. Because Zanzibar is not a member of FIFA, their team is not eligible for the FIFA World Cup.

The Zanzibar Football Association also has a Premier League for the top clubs, which was created in 1981. The teams also participate in the FA knockout competition, Zanzibari Cup and the Mapinduzi Cup, a knockout competition organized in early January between 6–13 January to mark the revolution day (12 January).

Cricket was historically popular in Zanzibar. In the 1950s and 1960s, the island hosted touring teams from England, India, Pakistan, South Africa and Uganda, but the sport declined following the 1964 revolution. Zanzibar contributed some players to the East Africa cricket team in the late 20th century. Efforts to revive the game in the 21st century have been led by Indian firms, with plans announced in 2022 for an international-grade cricket ground in Fumba with the support of the Zanzibar government.

Since 1992, there has also been judo in Zanzibar. The founder, Tsuyoshi Shimaoka, established a team that participates in national and international competitions. In 1999, Zanzibar Judo Association (Z.J.A.) was registered and became an active member of the Tanzania Olympic Committee  and International Judo Federation.

 Notable people 
Farouque Abdillahi, Princess Diana's designer
Said Salim Bakhresa, billionaire business tycoon born in Zanzibar, chairperson of Bakhresa Group of Companies
Abdulrazak Gurnah, winner of the 2021 Nobel Prize in Literature; born in Zanzibar in 1948 and emigrated to Britain as a student in 1968
Lubaina Himid, artist and winner of the 2017 Turner Prize, born 1954
Salama Jabir, journalist, TV host, media entertainer
Javed Jafferji, award-winning photographer and publisher; received the Almanacs Top 100 Africans for his work in promoting Africa worldwide
Bi Kidude, Taarab singer of Taarab and Unyago music, received WOMEX award in 2005
Faruk Malik, Ugandan official and spy under Idi Amin
Freddie Mercury (born Farrokh Bulsara), British singer of the rock band Queen, born in Stone Town; at age 17, fled with his family to the United Kingdom during the Zanzibar Revolution 
Siti binti Saad, pioneering artist in Taarab

 Gallery 

 See also 
German East Africa
List of Sultans of Zanzibar
Zanzibari cuisine
Hussein Mwinyi

 References 

 Bibliography 

 Further reading 

Chapurukha Kusimba, The Rise and Decline of Swahili States (Walnut Creek, California: AltaMira Press, 1999)
Don Petterson, Revolution in Zanzibar (Boulder, Colorado: Westview Press, 2002)
Emily Ruete, Memoirs of an Arabian Princess from Zanzibar, 1888 (many reprints). The author (1844–1924) was born Princess Salme of Zanzibar and Oman and was a daughter of Sayyid Said.
H. S. Newman, Banani: the Transition from Slavery to Freedom in Zanzibar and Pemba (London, 1898)
W. W. A. FitzGerald, Travels in the Coastlands of British East Africa (London, 1898)
Robert Nunez Lyne, Zanzibar in Contemporary Times: A Short History of the Southern East in the Nineteenth Century (London, 1905)
J. E. E. Craster, Pemba: The Spice Island of Zanzibar (London, 1913)
Godfrey Mwakikagile, Nyerere and Africa: End of an Era (Pretoria, South Africa: New Africa Press, 2010); Tanzania under Mwalimu Nyerere: Reflections on an African Statesman (Pretoria, South Africa: New Africa Press, 2006); Why Tanganyika united with Zanzibar to form Tanzania (Dar es Salaam, Tanzania, 2014); The Union of Tanganyika and Zanzibar: Formation of Tanzania and its Challenges (Dar es Salaam, Tanzania, 2016) 
Pearce, Francis Barrow (1920). Zanzibar, the Island Metropolis of Eastern Africa New York, NY: E. P. Dutton and Company.Hatice Uğur, Osmanlı Afrikası'nda Bir Sultanlık: Zengibar (Zanzibar as a Sultanate in the Ottoman Africa), İstanbul: Küre Yayınları, 2005. kureyayinlari.com For its English version, see Boun.edu
Wolfgang Scholz, Challenges of Informal Urbanisation. The Case of Zanzibar/Tanzania (Dortmund, 2008) Amazon.de
Christopher Gallop, Letters from East Africa'' (UK, Grosvenor House Publishing 2013)

External links 

Government of Zanzibar
Current and forecast weather for Zanzibar
President's office
Tourism Portal

 
Swahili city-states
Arabic-speaking countries and territories
Former Portuguese colonies
States and territories established in 1963
1963 establishments in Africa
Former observer states of the Organisation of Islamic Cooperation
Former monarchies of Africa
Former British protectorates
Island countries
Former sultanates